Agnes of Cleves (1422–1448) was a daughter of Adolph I, Duke of Cleves and his second wife Mary of Valois, daughter of John the Fearless duke of Burgundy.

In 1439, Agnes married Charles, Prince of Viana. He had been bequeathed the kingdom of Navarre.  His right to be King of Navarre had been recognised by the Cortes; but when his mother Blanche died in 1441, her husband King John II of Aragon had seized the kingdom to the exclusion of his son. Charles and Agnes had no children.

Agnes died on 6 April 1448, aged only 25 or 26. After Agnes' death, her husband decided to remarry with his choice being Infanta Catherine of Portugal. However, Charles died in 1461 before the marriage could take place.

References 

 

 

1422 births
1448 deaths
Navarrese royal consorts
People from the Duchy of Cleves
Princesses of Viana
15th-century German nobility
15th-century German women
15th-century nobility from the Kingdom of Navarre